Tennis has been an event at the Central American and Caribbean Games since 1926. It was not held in Panama City in 1970, but has otherwise been a permanent sport. Cuba's Juan Pino is the most successful Central American and Caribbean Games tennis player of all-time, in terms of medals won (12).

Medal summary

Men's singles

Men's doubles

Men's team

Women's singles

Women's doubles

Women's team

Mixed doubles

See also
Tennis at the Pan American Games

References

Tennis at the Central American and Caribbean Games
Central American and Caribbean Games